Ted Malone was a radio broadcaster.

Ted Malone may also refer to:

 Edward Cyril Malone, former leader of the Saskatchewan Liberal Party
Ted Malone (Australian politician)

See also
Edward Malone (disambiguation)